is a former Japanese football player and manager. He currently assistant head coach J3 League club of AC Nagano Parceiro

Playing career
Yoshizawa was born in Maebashi on April 10, 1972. After graduating from high school, he played for Honda as defender from 1991 to 2001.

Coaching career
Since 2005, Yoshizawa managed for the Japan Football League clubs Honda and FC Ryukyu as well as the Japanese Regional Leagues club Matsumoto Yamaga FC. In 2012, he became manager for J2 League club Gainare Tottori.

Managerial statistics

References

External links

1972 births
Living people
Association football people from Gunma Prefecture
Japanese footballers
Japan Soccer League players
Japan Football League (1992–1998) players
Japan Football League players
Honda FC players
Japanese football managers
J2 League managers
J3 League managers
FC Ryukyu managers
Matsumoto Yamaga FC managers
Gainare Tottori managers
AC Nagano Parceiro managers
Association football defenders